Uday Ananthan  is an Indian filmmaker who works in Malayalam cinema. He is best known for his 2007 film, Pranayakalam, and Mrityunjayam, a short film, which is part of the 2009 Malayalam anthology film, Kerala Cafe. In July 2016, his third directorial feature, White, starring Mammootty and Huma Qureshi was released.

Filmography
Pranayakalam (2007)
Mrityunjayam (2009) (short film)
White (2016)

References

External links
 https://www.imdb.com/name/nm2776729/
 http://174.121.153.209/person/uday-ananthan

Living people
Malayalam film directors
Indian male screenwriters
Malayalam screenwriters
Film directors from Thrissur
Screenwriters from Kerala
Year of birth missing (living people)